Princeton Board of Education may refer to:
 Princeton City Schools (Ohio)
 Princeton School District (Wisconsin)
 Princeton Public Schools (New Jersey)